An aircraft flight manual (AFM) is a paper book or electronic information set containing information required to operate an aircraft of certain type or particular aircraft of that type (each AFM is tailored for a specific aircraft, though aircraft of the same type naturally have very similar AFMs). The information within an AFM is also referred to a Technical Airworthiness Data (TAWD). A typical flight manual will contain the following: operating limitations, Normal/Abnormal/Emergency operating procedures, performance data and loading information.

An AFM will often include:

 V speeds
 Aircraft gross weight
 Maximum ramp weight
 Maximum takeoff weight
 Manufacturer's empty weight
 Operating empty weight
 Centre of gravity limitations
 Zero-fuel weight
 Takeoff distance
 Landing distance

Originally, an AFM would follow whichever format and order the manufacturer felt appropriate. Eventually, the General Aviation Manufacturers Association came to an agreement to standardize in a GAMA Specification No. 1 the format of AFM's for general aviation airplanes and helicopters known as the Pilot's Operating Handbook (POH).

The chapters of a POH always follow the format of:
 General
 Limitations
 Emergency Procedures
 Normal Procedures
 Performance
 Weight and Balance/Equipment List
 Systems Description
 Handling, Service, and Maintenance
 Supplements

See also 
 Electronic flight bag
 Quick Reference Handbook

References

External links 
 Flight Manuals (UK CAA)
 US FAA Flight Manuals and Other Documents

Aircraft operations
Aviation publications